Cotoneaster simonsii (syn. Cotoneaster newryensis), the Himalyan cotoneaster, is a species of flowering plant in the family Rosaceae. It is native to Nepal, the eastern Himalayas, Assam, and Myanmar, and has been introduced to a number of locales in Europe, the west coast of North America, and Australia as a garden escapee. The Royal Horticultural Society considers it to be an undesirable invasive non-native species.

Description
It apex is acute, while the base is either cuneate or obtuse. The fruits are globose, obovoid, red and shiny, with green coloured calyx lobes which are flat. The flowers bloom in June, while  fruits ripen from September to October.

Cultivation history
As its synonym C. newryensis, it was first raised at Thomas Smith's Daisy Hill Nursery in Ireland from where it was moved to be distributed by Barbier Nursery in France. It appeared at Lemoine nursery catalogue by 1911 in Nancy, France.

References

simonsii
Garden plants of Asia
Flora of Nepal
Flora of East Himalaya
Flora of Assam (region)
Flora of Myanmar
Plants described in 1869